Applewood Park is a residential neighbourhood in the southeast quadrant of Calgary, Alberta. It is located at the eastern edge of the city, north of 17 Avenue SE. Elliston Park, the site of GlobalFest fireworks, is located southwest of the community.

Applewood was established in 1982 and is represented in the Calgary City Council by the Ward 9 councillor. The community has an area structure plan in place.

Demographics

Residents in this community had a median household income of $65,724 in 2000, and there were 14.8% low income residents living in the neighbourhood. As of 2000, 38.6% of the residents were immigrants. A proportion of 1.4% of the buildings were condominiums or apartments, and 11.4% of the housing was used for renting.

See also
List of neighbourhoods in Calgary

References

External links
Applewood Park Community Association

Neighbourhoods in Calgary